Thurlow Thomas Rogers (born March 7, 1960 in Burbank, California) is a retired American cyclist. He competed in the men's individual road race in the 1984 Summer Olympics.

Palmares

1982
2nd Coors Classic
1983
Giro delle Regioni
1st stage 6, part b
1st overall
1985
8th stage Coors Classic
Redlands Bicycle Classic
Prologue
Stage 1
1st overall
1986
3rd United States National Road Race Championships
Mammoth Classic
1st overall
Stage 2
1987
2nd Redlands Bicycle Classic
1990
3rd Cascade Classic
1992
Redlands Bicycle Classic
Stage 2
Stage 4
3rd overall
1996
1st Joe Martin Stage Race
1998
3rd Sea Otter Classic

References

1960 births
Living people
American male cyclists
Cyclists at the 1984 Summer Olympics
Olympic cyclists of the United States
Pan American Games medalists in cycling
Medalists at the 1983 Pan American Games
Pan American Games gold medalists for the United States